Royal Palace Museum may refer to:

 Royal Palace, Luang Prabang
Royal Palace Museum (Porto-Novo)

See also
 Royal Palace (disambiguation)
 Palace museum